Anaectocalyx is a genus of flowering plants belonging to the family Melastomataceae.

Its native range is Venezuela and Northeastern Argentina.

Species:

Anaectocalyx bracteosa 
Anaectocalyx latifolia 
Anaectocalyx manarae

References

Melastomataceae
Melastomataceae genera